Elections to Leeds City Council were held on 1 May 1975. One third of the seats, as well as an extra vacancy in Aireborough, were up for election. Labour had gained a seat from a by-election in Burley in the interim, prompted by the arrest of incumbent Conservative Ray Forbes in connection with arms smuggling.

The election resulted in a substantial swing to the Conservatives, helping them gain six seats in total, with four from Labour (Burley, Kirkstall, Pudsey South and Wortley) and two from the Liberals (Horsforth and Otley). This established the Conservatives as the largest party on the council, but with the council remaining under no overall control.

Election result

This result has the following consequences for the total number of seats on the Council after the elections:

Ward results

References

1975 English local elections
1975
1970s in Leeds